Robert Sherwood Haggart (March 13, 1914 – December 2, 1998) was an American dixieland jazz double bass player, composer, and arranger. Although he is associated with dixieland, he was one of the finest rhythm bassists of the Swing Era.

Music career
In 1935, Haggart became a member of the Bob Crosby Band. He arranged and composed "Big Noise from Winnetka", "My Inspiration", "What's New?", and "South Rampart Street Parade". He remained with the band until it dissolved in 1942, then began working as session musician, with much of his time spent at Decca Records. He recorded with Billie Holiday, Duke Ellington, Benny Goodman, and Ella Fitzgerald; his arrangements can be heard on Fitzgerald's album Lullabies of Birdland.  Haggart also starred in several commercials for L&M cigarettes on the radio program "Gunsmoke", including the March 4, 1956 episode, "The Hunter".

He and Yank Lawson formed the Lawson-Haggart Band, and they also led the World's Greatest Jazz Band from 1968 until 1978. He appeared at jazz festivals until his death on December 2, 1998 in Venice, Florida.

Discography
 Strictly from Dixie (MGM, 1960)
 Big Noise from Winnetka (Command, 1962)
 Live at the Roosevelt Grill (Atlantic, 1970)
 What's New? (Atlantic, 1971)
 Makes a Sentimental Journey (Jazzology, 1980)
 Enjoys Carolina in the Morning (Jazzology, 1981)
 A Portrait of Bix (Jazzology, 1986)
 Enjoy Yourself! (Audiophile, 1986) 
 Hag Leaps In (Arbors, 1995)
 The All-Stars at Bob Haggart's 80th Birthday Party (Arbors, 2002)
 The Piano Giants at Bob Haggart's 80th Birthday Party (Arbors, 2002)
 The Music of Bob Haggart (Arbors, 2002)

References

Further reading

External links
 
 
 Bob Haggart recordings at the Discography of American Historical Recordings.
 Yank Lawson and Bob Haggart: Profiles in Jazz  by Scott Yanow
 
 Bob Haggart Interview NAMM Oral History Library (1995)

1914 births
1998 deaths
Dixieland jazz musicians
American jazz double-bassists
Male double-bassists
American session musicians
20th-century American musicians
20th-century double-bassists
20th-century American male musicians
American male jazz musicians
The Tonight Show Band members
World's Greatest Jazz Band members
McKenzie and Condon's Chicagoans members
Jazzology Records artists
Atlantic Records artists
Arbors Records artists